Philo (c. 30 BCE – c. 50 CE) was a leading writer of the Hellenistic Jewish community in Alexandria, Egypt. He wrote expansively in Koine Greek on the intersection of philosophy, politics, and religion in his time, specifically he explored the connections between Greek Platonic philosophy and late Second Temple Judaism. For example, he maintained that the Septuagint (the Greek translation of the Hebrew Bible and additional books) and Jewish law (which was still being developed by the rabbis in this period) are a blueprint for the pursuit of individual enlightenment.

Philo interpreted the stories of the Pentateuch (first five books) as elaborate metaphors and symbols. He did not reject the subjective experience of ancient Judaism; yet, he repeatedly explained that the Septuagint cannot be understood as a concrete, objective history. Philo was largely shaped by contemporary Greek philosophy. For example, he explained that ideal Greek forms for reason and wisdom illustrated the deep, mystical truth of God and Judaism.

Philo stated his theology both through the negation of opposed ideas, and through detailed, positive explanations of the nature of God. In his negative statement, he contrasted the nature of God with the nature of the physical world. He integrated select theology from the rabbinic tradition, including God's sublime transcendence, and man's inability to behold an ineffable God. However, he significantly disagreed with the theology that God actively changes the world, is filled with zeal, is moved by repentance, and aids his chosen people.

Philo did not consider God similar to heaven, the world, or man; his God existed neither in time nor space and had no human attributes or emotions. He argued that God has no attributes (ἁπλοῡς), in consequence no name (ἅρρητος), and for that reason he cannot be perceived by man (ἀκατάληπτος). Further, God cannot change (ἅτρεπτος): He is always the same (ἀΐδιος). He needs no other being (χρῄζει γὰρ οὐδενὸς τὸ παράπαν), and is self-sufficient (ἑαυτῷ ἱκανός). God can never perish (ἅφθαρτος). He is the simply existent (ὁ ὤν, τὸ ὄν), and has no relations with any other being (τὸ γὰρ ὄν, ᾗ ὄν ἐστιν, οὐχὶ τῶν πρός τι).

Anthropomorphisms 
Philo characterizes as a monstrous impiety the anthropomorphism of the Bible, which ascribes to God hands and feet, eyes and ears, tongue and windpipe. Scripture, he says, adapts itself to human conceptions; and for pedagogic reasons God is occasionally represented as a man. The same holds good also as regards God's anthropopathic attributes. God as such is untouched by unreasonable emotions, as appears, e.g., from Exodus ii. 12, where Moses, torn by his emotions, perceives God alone to be calm. He is free from sorrow, pain, and all such affections. But He is frequently represented as endowed with human emotions; and this serves to explain expressions referring to His repentance.

Similarly God cannot exist or change in space. He has no "where" (πού, obtained by changing the accent in Gen. iii. 9: "Adam, where [ποῡ] art thou?"), is not in any place. He is Himself the place; the dwelling-place of God means the same as God Himself, as in the Mishnah  = "God is" (comp. Freudenthal, "Hellenistische Studien," p. 73), corresponding to the tenet of Greek philosophy that the existence of all things is summed up in God. God as such is motionless, as the Bible indicates by the phrase "God stands".

Doctrine of the Divine Attributes
Although, as shown above, Philo repeatedly endeavored to find the Divine Being active and acting in the world, in agreement with Stoicism, yet his Platonic repugnance to matter predominated, and consequently whenever he posited that the divine could not have any contact with evil, he defined matter as evil, with the result that he placed God outside of the world. Hence he was obliged to separate from the Divine Being the activity displayed in the world and to transfer it to the divine powers, which accordingly were sometimes inherent in God and at other times exterior to God.

This doctrine, as worked out by Philo, was composed of very different elements, including Greek philosophy, Biblical conceptions, pagan and late Jewish views. The Greek elements were borrowed partly from Platonic philosophy, insofar as the divine powers were conceived as types or patterns of actual things ("archetypal ideas"), and partly from Stoic philosophy, insofar as those powers were regarded as the efficient causes that not only represent the types of things, but also produce and maintain them. They fill the whole world, and in them are contained all being and all individual things ("De Confusione Linguarum," § 34 [i. 431]). Philo endeavored to harmonize this conception with the Bible by designating these powers as angels ("De Gigantibus," § 2 [i. 263]; "De Somniis," i. 22 [i. 641 et seq.]), whereby he destroyed an essential characteristic of the Biblical view. He further made use of the pagan conception of demons (ib.). And finally he was influenced by the late Jewish doctrine of the throne-chariot, in connection with which he in a way detaches one of God's fundamental powers, a point which will be discussed further on. In the Haggadah this fundamental power divides into two contrasts, which modify each other.

In the same way Philo contrasts the two divine attributes of goodness and power (ἄγαθότης and ἀρχή, δίναμις χαριστική and συγκολαστική). They are also expressed in the names of God; but Philo's explanation is confusing. "Yhwh" really designates God as the kind and merciful one, while "Elohim" designates him as the just one. Philo, however, interpreted "Elohim" (LXX. Θεός) as designating the "cosmic power"; and as he considered the Creation the most important proof of divine goodness, he found the idea of goodness especially in Θεός. On the parallel activity of the two powers and the symbols used therefor in Scripture, as well as on their emanation from God and their further development into new powers, their relation to God and the world, their part in the Creation, their tasks toward man, etc., see Siegfried, "Philo," pp. 214–218. Philo's exposition here is not entirely clear, as he sometimes conceives the powers to be independent hypostases and sometimes regards them as immanent attributes of the Divine Being.

The Logos
Philo used the term Logos to mean an intermediary divine being, or demiurge. Philo followed the Platonic distinction between imperfect matter and perfect Form, and therefore intermediary beings were necessary to bridge the enormous gap between God and the material world.  The Logos was the highest of these intermediary beings, and was called by Philo "the first-born of God."

Philo also wrote that "the Logos of the living God is the bond of everything, holding all things together and binding all the parts, and prevents them from being dissolved and separated."

Philo considers these divine powers in their totality also, treating them as a single independent being, which he designates "Logos". This name, which he borrowed from Greek philosophy, was first used by Heraclitus and then adopted by the Stoics. Philo's conception of the Logos is influenced by both of these schools. From Heraclitus he borrowed the conception of the "dividing Logos" (λόγος τομεύς), which calls the various objects into existence by the combination of contrasts ("Quis Rerum Divinarum Heres Sit," § 43 [i. 503]), and from Stoicism, the characterization of the Logos as the active and vivifying power. But Philo borrowed also Platonic elements in designating the Logos as the "idea of ideas" and the "archetypal idea".

There are, in addition, Biblical elements: there are Biblical passages in which the word of Yhwh is regarded as a power acting independently and existing by itself, as Isaiah 55:11; these ideas were further developed by later Judaism in the doctrines of the Divine Word creating the world, the divine throne-chariot and its cherub, the divine splendor and its shekinah, and the name of God as well as the names of the angels; and Philo borrowed from all these in elaborating his doctrine of the Logos. He calls the Logos "second god [deuteros theos]" (Questions and Answers on Genesis 2:62), the "archangel of many names," "taxiarch" (corps-commander), the "name of God," also the "heavenly Adam", the "man, the word of the eternal God."

The Logos is also designated as "high priest", in reference to the exalted position which the high priest occupied after the Exile as the real center of the Jewish state. The Logos, like the high priest, is the expiator of sins, and the mediator and advocate for men: ἱκέτης, and παράκλητος.

From Alexandrian theology Philo borrowed the idea of wisdom as the mediator; he thereby somewhat confused his doctrine of the Logos, regarding wisdom as the higher principle from which the Logos proceeds, and again coordinating it with the latter.

Relation of the Logos to God
Philo's conception of the Logos is directly related to the Middle Platonic view of God as unmoved and utterly transcendent. As such, the Logos becomes the aspect of the divine that operates in the world—through whom the world is created and sustained. Philo, in connecting his doctrine of the Logos with Scripture, first of all bases on Gen. i. 27 the relation of the Logos to God. He translates this passage as follows: "He made man after the image of God," concluding therefrom that an image of God existed. This image of God is the type for all other things (the "Archetypal Idea" of Plato), a seal impressed upon things. The Logos is a kind of shadow cast by God, having the outlines but not the blinding light of the Divine Being.

Pneumatology
The relation of the Logos to the divine powers, especially to the two fundamental powers, must now be examined. And here is found a twofold series of exegetic expositions. According to one, the Logos stands higher than the two powers; according to the other, it is in a way the product of the two powers; similarly it occasionally appears as the chief and leader of the innumerable powers proceeding from the primal powers, and again as the aggregate or product of them.

In its relation to the world the Logos appears as the Universal substance on which all things depend; and from this point of view the manna (as γενικώτατόν τι) becomes a symbol for it. The Logos, however, is not only the archetype of things, but also the power that produces them, appearing as such especially under the name of the Logos τομεύς ("the divider"). It separates the individual beings of nature from one another according to their characteristics; but, on the other hand, it constitutes the bond connecting the individual creatures, uniting their spiritual and physical attributes. It may be said to have invested itself with the whole world as an indestructible garment. It appears as the director and shepherd of the things in the world insofar as they are in motion.

The Logos has a special relation to man. It is the type; man is the copy. The similarity is found in the mind (νοῡς) of man. For the shaping of his nous, man (earthly man) has the Logos (the "heavenly man") for a pattern. The latter officiates here also as "the divider" (τομεύς), separating and uniting. The Logos as "interpreter" announces God's designs to man, acting in this respect as prophet and priest. As the latter, he softens punishments by making the merciful power stronger than the punitive. The Logos has a special mystic influence upon the human soul, illuminating it and nourishing it with a higher spiritual food, like the manna, of which the smallest piece has the same vitality as the whole.

See also
 Cairo Geniza
 Elephantine papyri
 Jewish temple at Elephantine
 Land of Onias
 Philosophy
 Philo's Works
 Pseudo-Philo
 Moses in rabbinic literature

Notes

References 

Ancient Jewish Egyptian history
Conceptions of God
Jewish theology
Philo